The 2019 African Weightlifting Championships was held in Cairo, Egypt from 25 to 29 April 2019. It was the 29th men's and 18th women's championship.

Medal summary

Men

Women

Medal table 
Ranking by Big (Total result) medals

Ranking by all medals: Big (Total result) and Small (Snatch and Clean & Jerk)

Team ranking

Men

Women

Participating nations

References

External links
 Results
 Result Book

African Weightlifting Championships
African Weightlifting Championships
African Weightlifting Championships
International weightlifting competitions hosted by Egypt
Sports competitions in Cairo
African Weightlifting Championships